The Shelby Colonels were a Tar Heel League (1940), Western Carolina League (1960–1962) and Western Carolinas League (1963) baseball team based in Shelby, North Carolina. They were affiliated with the Washington Senators in 1940, the Pittsburgh Pirates in 1961 and the New York Yankees in 1963.

Under managers Aaron Robinson and James Adlam, they won the league championship in 1961, despite posting a losing record during the regular season.

References

Baseball teams established in 1940
Professional baseball teams in North Carolina
Defunct minor league baseball teams
Defunct Western Carolinas League teams
Washington Senators minor league affiliates
Pittsburgh Pirates minor league affiliates
New York Yankees minor league affiliates
Defunct baseball teams in North Carolina
Baseball teams disestablished in 1963
Baseball teams disestablished in 1940
Baseball teams established in 1960
Tar Heel League teams